Anna Pfeffer (born 31 August 1945, Kaposvár) is a Hungarian sprint canoeist who competed from the late 1960s to the late 1970s. She is Jewish.

Competing in three Summer Olympics, she won three medals with two silvers (K-2 500 m: 1968, 1976) and one bronze (1972: K-1 500 m).

Pfeffer also won four medals at the ICF Canoe Sprint World Championships with a gold (K-2 500 m: 1971), a silver (K-4 500 m: 1973), and two bronzes (K-2 500 m: 1966, 1973).

References

External links 
 

 
 

1945 births
Living people
Hungarian female canoeists
Canoeists at the 1968 Summer Olympics
Canoeists at the 1972 Summer Olympics
Canoeists at the 1976 Summer Olympics
Olympic canoeists of Hungary
Olympic silver medalists for Hungary
Olympic bronze medalists for Hungary
Olympic medalists in canoeing
ICF Canoe Sprint World Championships medalists in kayak
Medalists at the 1976 Summer Olympics
Medalists at the 1972 Summer Olympics
Medalists at the 1968 Summer Olympics
Hungarian Jews
People from Kaposvár
Sportspeople from Somogy County